Sarah: Women of Genesis (2000) is the first novel in the Women of Genesis series by Orson Scott Card.

Plot introduction
Sarah follows the story of Abraham through the eyes and perspective of Sarah.  The Biblical account of the life of Sarah is contained in Genesis 12 - 22 (about 16 pages) most of which is centered on Abraham.  Card expands the story into a novel of over 300 pages, so many of the details and characters are fictional. He also seems to use the Book of Abraham, a section of the LDS Standard Works. The core story-line does not deviate from the story told in Genesis and the Book of Abraham, although some of the details are reinterpreted.

Sarah begins life as a princess of Ur in Mesopotamia. She is hard-working and humble especially compared to her older sister Qira.  Sarai is promised to become a priestess for the goddess Asherah, while Qira is to marry a desert prince named Lot.  Sarai's thoughts on a life as a priestess change when Lot arrives with his uncle Abram who promises Sarai that he'll come back and marry her.

See also

List of works by Orson Scott Card
Orson Scott Card

External links
 About the novel Sarah from Card's website

2000 American novels
Novels by Orson Scott Card
Historical novels
Novels based on the Bible
Cultural depictions of Abraham